Holy Saviour's Church, is a 19th-century church in Gyumri, Armenia. It occupies the southern side of the Vartanants Square at the centre of Gyumri. It was constructed between 1858 and 1872 and consecrated in 1873.

History

During the 1850s, an Armenian Catholic church and a Greek Orthodox church were built at the centre of Alexandropol-Gyumri. Feeling insulted of this fact, the devotees of the Armenian Apostolic Church (who constituted the majority of the city's population) decided to build a new church right in the middle of the 2 churches that existed, which would look larger and much imposing. The construction of the church was launched in 1858 led by architect Tadeos Andikyan who was known as the master of masters and the oustabashi. It was completed in 1872 and consecrated in 1873. The construction was fulfilled through the donations of the population of Alexandropol and the Drampyan family.

The design of the church was derived from the architecture of the Cathedral of Ani. However the Holy Saviour Church is much larger than the Cathedral of Ani.

The church survived from the 1926 earthquake. At beginning of the 1930s, it was confiscated by the Soviet government and the belfry was destroyed in 1932. Later in 1964, the belfry was restored. However, during the Soviet rule, the church building was used as a museum, and later as a classical music concerts hall.

During the devastating 1988 earthquake, the Church of the Holy Saviour was severely damaged and went under an entire renovation process since 2002. Currently, the renovation is at its final stages and the church was expected to be reopened in 2015. However, the church remains closed and under renovation as of late 2019.

References

Buildings and structures in Gyumri
Churches completed in 1873
Tourist attractions in Shirak Province